Tia Jasmin Hälinen (born 18 February 1994) is a Finnish footballer who plays as a midfielder for HJK and the Finland national team. She previously played for PK-35, Kokkola F10, FC Honka and HJK of the Naisten Liiga. She also played in Spain for Santa Teresa CD, and in the Czech Republic for Sparta Prague.

Club career
In July 2018 Hälinen agreed a transfer from Sparta Prague to Eskilstuna United DFF of the Swedish Damallsvenskan. She left her home country in February 2017, signing for Spanish Primera División club Santa Teresa CD.

International career
Hälinen made her debut for the Finland women's national team on 29 May 2015, in a 2–0 defeat by Norway in Drammen. She was a part of Finland's 2013 UEFA Women's Under-19 Championship team, which reached the semi-finals. She was also a member of the Finland squad at the 2014 FIFA U-20 Women's World Cup in Canada.

References

External links
 
 Tia Hälinen at Football Association of Finland (SPL) 
 Tia Hälinen at AupaAthletic 

1994 births
Finnish women's footballers
Finnish expatriate footballers
Living people
Finland women's international footballers
Kansallinen Liiga players
Eskilstuna United DFF players
Damallsvenskan players
Expatriate women's footballers in Sweden
Finnish expatriate sportspeople in Sweden
PK-35 Vantaa (women) players
Santa Teresa CD players
FC Honka (women) players
Kokkola Futis 10 players
Helsingin Jalkapalloklubi (women) players
Women's association football midfielders
Expatriate women's footballers in the Czech Republic
Finnish expatriate sportspeople in the Czech Republic
AC Sparta Praha (women) players
People from Kirkkonummi
Czech Women's First League players
Sportspeople from Uusimaa
21st-century Finnish women